WXHR-LP (97.3 FM) is a radio station licensed to serve the community of Hillman, Michigan. The station is owned by Hillman Community Radio and airs a community radio format.

The station was assigned the WXHR-LP call letters by the Federal Communications Commission on June 9, 2015. In September 2020 the station moved from 103.5 FM to 97.3 FM.

References

External links
 
 

XHR-LP
Radio stations established in 2016
2016 establishments in Michigan
Community radio stations in the United States
Alpena County, Michigan
Montmorency County, Michigan